Dhi Qar Sport Club, is an Iraqi football team based in Dhi Qar, that plays in Iraq Division Three.

Managerial history
  Jalil Ibrahim

See also 
 2021–22 Iraq Division Three

References

External links
 Iraq Clubs- Foundation Dates

1991 establishments in Iraq
Association football clubs established in 1991
Football clubs in Dhi Qar